Guillermo Reynaldo Cortez (13 March 1939 – 17 July 1969) was an officer in the Air Force of El Salvador, and is a national hero in El Salvador. He sacrificed his life during the 100-Hour War with Honduras (also known as the Football War) by grounding his plane in a field to avoid hitting civilians.

Born in San Salvador on 13 March 1939, Cortez was admitted to the El Salvador Military Academy at age 17. On 29 January 1960, he went to San Antonio to attend flight school at Randolph Air Force Base. Cortez received high marks, and returned a year later as a certified pilot. In 1962 he was promoted to lieutenant and awarded the Civic Merit Honor military medal. Cortez remained in the air force; in 1965 he became commander of a patrol and battle group, and in 1967 was promoted to captain.

On 15 July 1969, Cortez was injured in the leg while engaged in an air attack on Toncontín International Airport in Honduras. On 17 July 1969, while flying a Goodyear FG-1D Corsair, he was engaged in an air battle above San Jose de La Fuente, El Salvador, with Honduran F4U-5s and hit with a 20mm cannon from one of the planes. Mortally wounded, Cortez managed to keep his plane aloft until reaching the outskirts of the city while radioing that he was going to try to find an uninhabited area to land. He crashed on the outskirts of the city, and was killed on impact.

Cortez was the highest-ranking officer among the casualties of the 100-Hour War.

References

1939 births
1969 deaths
People from San Salvador
Salvadoran military personnel